Peter Gwargis (born 4 September 2000) is a Swedish professional footballer who plays for Jönköpings Södra, on loan form Malmö FF as a midfielder.

Early and personal life
Gwargis was born in Sydney, Australia. His parents are Assyrians from Iraq, and the family moved to Sweden when he was three.

Club career
Gwargis spent his early career in Sweden with IFK Öxnehaga, Husqvarna and Jönköpings Södra. In January 2017 he was linked with a transfer to English club Arsenal. He signed for Brighton & Hove Albion in August 2018. He made his senior debut for the club on 25 September 2019, in a 1–3 home defeat to Aston Villa in the EFL Cup.

In April 2021 it was announced Gwargis was to be released by Brighton & Hove Albion ay the end of the season. He was linked to a move to Malmö in May 2021, signing with the club in June 2021. In February 2022 he moved on loan to Jönköpings Södra.

International career
Gwargis has represented Sweden at under-17 and under-19 youth international levels. He is also eligible to represent Australia on account of being born there.

Playing style
Gwargis has been compared to Mesut Özil.

References

2000 births
Living people
Swedish footballers
IFK Öxnehaga players
Husqvarna FF players
Jönköpings Södra IF players
Brighton & Hove Albion F.C. players
Malmö FF players
Ettan Fotboll players
Superettan players
Association football midfielders
Sweden youth international footballers
Swedish expatriate footballers
Swedish expatriates in England
Expatriate footballers in England
Swedish people of Iraqi descent
Swedish people of Assyrian/Syriac descent
Allsvenskan players
Australian emigrants to Sweden